Harold Feehan (21 April 1895 – 7 June 1979) was an Australian rules footballer who played with Essendon in the Victorian Football League (VFL).

Notes

External links 
		

1895 births
1979 deaths
Australian rules footballers from Melbourne
Essendon Football Club players
People from Essendon, Victoria